"I've Got You Under My Skin" is a song written by American composer Cole Porter in 1936. It was introduced that year in the Eleanor Powell musical film Born to Dance in which it was performed by Virginia Bruce. It was nominated for the Academy Award for Best Original Song that year but lost out to The Way You Look Tonight.  Popular recordings in 1936 were by Ray Noble and his Orchestra (vocal by Al Bowlly) and by Hal Kemp and his Orchestra (vocal by Skinnay Ennis).

The song has subsequently been recorded by hundreds of artists. It became a signature song for Frank Sinatra, and, in 1966, became a top 10 hit for the Four Seasons. Swedish singer-songwriter Neneh Cherry had a European hit with her reworking of the song for the 1990 Red Hot + Blue charity album.

Charts

Weekly charts
Louis Prima and Keely Smith

The Four Seasons

Year-end charts
The Four Seasons

Versions by Frank Sinatra
Sinatra first sang the song in 1946 on his weekly radio show, as the second part of a medley with "Easy to Love".

He recorded a studio version of the song with Nelson Riddle orchestral arrangement, accompanied by Irv Cottler on drums and slide trombone solo by Milt Bernhart at Capitol's Melrose Avenue studios for his 1956 album Songs for Swingin' Lovers! Riddle was a fan of Maurice Ravel and said that this arrangement was inspired by the Boléro. Sinatra aficionados usually rank this as one of his finest collaborations with Riddle's orchestra.

Sinatra re-recorded "I've Got You Under My Skin" for the album Sinatra's Sinatra (1963), an album of re-recordings of his favourites. This time the trombone solo was by Dick Nash because Bernhart was unavailable.

A live version of the song appears on the 1966 album Sinatra at the Sands with Count Basie and his orchestra.

Another version of the song is an electronically assembled duet featuring Sinatra and U2 lead singer Bono on Sinatra's 1993 Duets album. The track was released on a "double A-side" with U2's "Stay (Faraway, So Close!)". The single peaked at number four on the UK charts.

Sinatra usually included "I've Got You Under My Skin" in his concerts—a tradition carried on by his son, Frank Sinatra Jr.

Certifications and sales

Neneh Cherry version

Swedish singer-songwriter and rapper Neneh Cherry's interpretation of "I've Got You Under My Skin" was released the lead single for the Red Hot + Blue charity album in September 1990 and reached number 25 on the UK Singles Chart. Additionally, it was a top 10 hit in Greece and entered the top 20 in the Netherlands and Sweden. It received critical acclaim from music critics. The accompanying music video was directed by Jean-Baptiste Mondino. Cherry replaced most of the lyrics with a rap on AIDS victims and how society reacts to them. Of the original Cole Porter lyrics, she kept only the first four lines and "Use your mentality, wake up to reality".

Critical reception
William Ruhlmann from AllMusic described the song as one of the most "radical reinterpretations" on Red Hot + Blue. David Browne from Entertainment Weekly felt the words have special urgency in Cherry's "stark, bass-line-propelled take" on "I’ve Got You Under My Skin", because the song begins with a rap about AIDS. Paul Lester from Melody Maker wrote that it's "pretty much unrecognisable from the original tinkly-suave piano nugget loved by pub singers and talent show chancers the world over." He explained, "Neneh's version starts with a rap, leads into a rubbery "White Lines" bass squiggle, before steel thwacks and programmed claps enclose the song in a glistening metal case. Not bad." Pan-European magazine Music & Media called it an "utterly brooding version of the old Cole Porter song, in a splendid production for the Jungle Brothers' Baby Afrika Bambaataa." 

Nick Robinson from Music Week stated, "With its dark atmosphere and subject matter, it's grim but effective." Gavin Martin from New Musical Express wrote, "Her provocative revision [...] not only reaffirms her status as the straightest, sharpest shooting soul sister on the block but matches sensitivity with invective in an elegant, mysterious refrain." Parry Gettelman from Orlando Sentinel found that the singer "eerily deconstructs "I've Got You Under My Skin" and injects it with a hip-hop safe-sex message." James Hunter from Rolling Stone remarked that the "genuine innovations" of Cherry set the tone of the album. Marc Andrews from Smash Hits felt the track "is the closest any of the artists here get to really putting the message across". Chris Norris from Spin complimented the singer-songwriter's "chillingly metaphorical" version of the jazz standard.

Charts

References

External links
 Cole Porter's "I've Got You Under My Skin" Piano Solo

1936 songs
1966 singles
Capitol Records singles
Frank Sinatra songs
Grammy Hall of Fame Award recipients
Neneh Cherry songs
Philips Records singles
Song recordings produced by Bob Crewe
Song recordings produced by Brendan O'Brien (record producer)
Songs written by Cole Porter
Songs written for films
The Four Seasons (band) songs
Song recordings produced by Cameron McVey
Song recordings produced by Jonny Dollar
Screamin' Jay Hawkins songs
Music videos directed by Jean-Baptiste Mondino